Sergei Ivanovich Bondar (born 5 May 1963) is a Russian professional football coach and a former player. Since 2016, he works as a director of sports of the Russian Football National League.

As a player, he made his debut in the Soviet Second League in 1991 for FC Znamya Truda Orekhovo-Zuyevo.

References

1963 births
People from Rubizhne
Living people
Soviet footballers
Russian footballers
Russian football managers
Association football defenders
FC Znamya Truda Orekhovo-Zuyevo players